is a junior and senior high school in Machida, Tokyo, affiliated with Nihon University.

It first opened in Akasaka in Tokyo City in 1929. In 1976 it moved to Machida. It began admitting both boys and girls in 1987; previously it only admitted male students.

Campus

It includes an American football field that opened in 2000.

References

External links
 Third Junior & Senior High School of Nihon University
 Third Junior & Senior High School of Nihon University 

High schools in Tokyo
Machida, Tokyo
1929 establishments in Japan
Educational institutions established in 1929